The de Sarthe Gallery is an art gallery in Hong Kong. It previously operated in Paris and in San Francisco.

History 

Pascal and Sylvie de Sarthe founded de Sarthe Gallery in Paris in 1977. The business moved to the United States in 1981; it dealt in both Eastern and Western contemporary art of the nineteenth and twentieth centuries. It moved to Duddell Street in Central, Hong Kong in 2011. In 2022 the gallery moved to a new building within the Wong Chuk Hang district.

Since 2015 it has been among the hundreds of galleries taking part in Art Basel Hong Kong.

Recognition 

The gallery was among the 500 best galleries in the world listed by Modern Painters in 2013.

de Sarthe was also awarded '"Best Art Gallery of The Year" in Asia' by CANS Magazine in 2017, Chinese Art News.

Pascal de Sarthe of de Sarthe Gallery was featured in the video 'The Rise of the Mobile Connoisseur', on BBC.com.

References

Art galleries established in 1977
Art museums and galleries in China